Georgi Malezanov (born 15 June 1927) is a Bulgarian former boxer who competed in the 1952 Summer Olympics.

References

External links
 

1927 births
Possibly living people
Bulgarian male boxers
Olympic boxers of Bulgaria
Boxers at the 1952 Summer Olympics
Featherweight boxers